The Canadian Cardiovascular Society (CCS) is the national voice for cardiovascular physicians and scientists in Canada. The CCS is a membership organization that represents more than 1,800 professionals in the cardiovascular field. Its mission is to promote cardiovascular health and care through knowledge translation, professional development and leadership in health policy.

The official journal of the Canadian Cardiovascular Society is the Canadian Journal of Cardiology (editor-in-chief – Stanley Nattel).

Partners and Affiliates 

In addition to the Heart and Stroke Foundation of Canada (HSFC), a number of other Canadian cardiovascular associations have established affiliations with the CCS, including those that represent physician specialities, nurses, researchers, technicians, and other cardiovascular professionals. The CCS and its affiliates are all active participants at the Canadian Cardiovascular Congress, which is conducted by the CCS and HSFC.

The Society also has strong ties with the Canadian Medical Association and is a specialty society of the Royal College of Physicians and Surgeons of Canada. Internationally, the CCS represents Canada at the Interamerican Society of Cardiology and together with the HSFC is the Canadian voice at the World Heart Federation.

Choosing Wisely Canada recommendations 

On April 2, 2014, the Society released a list of "Five Things Physicians and Patients Should Question" as part of the Choosing Wisely Canada campaign. CCS recommendations include:

1. Don’t perform stress cardiac imaging or advanced non-invasive imaging when initially evaluating patients when there are no cardiac symptoms present unless the patient has high-risk markers.

2. Don’t perform annual stress cardiac imaging or advanced non-invasive imaging in asymptomatic patients in a routine follow-up.

3. Don’t perform stress cardiac imaging or advanced non-invasive imaging in pre-operative assessment for patients who are scheduled to undergo low-risk non-cardiac surgery.

4. Don’t perform echocardiography in routine follow-up for adult patients who have mild, asymptomatic native valve disease with no change in signs or symptoms.

5. Don’t order annual electrocardiograms (ECGs) in patients who are low-risk and do not have any symptoms.

Canadian Cardiovascular Society Angina Grading Scale 

The Canadian Cardiovascular Society Angina Grading Scale is commonly used for the classification of severity of angina:
 Class I – Angina only during strenuous or prolonged physical activity
 Class II – Slight limitation, with angina only during vigorous physical activity
 Class III – Symptoms with everyday living activities, i.e., moderate limitation
 Class IV – Inability to perform any activity without angina or angina at rest, i.e., severe limitation

It is similar to the New York Heart Association Functional Classification of heart failure.

References

External links 
 Canadian Cardiovascular Society
 CCS Guideline Programs

Heart disease organizations